Erteberel (former developmental code name LY-500307; also known as selective estrogen receptor beta agonist-1 or SERBA-1) is a synthetic, nonsteroidal estrogen which acts as a selective ERβ agonist and is under development by Eli Lilly for the treatment of schizophrenia. It is specifically under investigation for the treatment of negative symptoms and cognitive impairment associated with the condition. As of 2015, it is in phase II clinical trials for this indication in the United States. Erteberel was also under investigation for the treatment of benign prostatic hyperplasia and reached phase II clinical studies for this use but failed to improve symptoms in men with the condition and development for this indication was discontinued. The drug has also been proposed as a potential novel treatment for glioblastoma.

Erteberel has 14-fold binding selectivity for the ERβ over the ERα (Ki = 0.19 nM versus 2.68 nM, respectively). However, it shows 32-fold functional selectivity for activation of the ERβ over the ERα (EC50 = 0.66 nM versus 19.4 nM, respectively). It is roughly a full agonist of both the ERβ and ERα (Emax = 101% versus 94%, respectively). Although selective for the ERβ, erteberel loses its selectivity at high dosages and activates the ERα as well, producing effects such as suppression of gonadal testosterone production in men.

See also
 List of investigational sex-hormonal agents § Estrogenics
 List of investigational antipsychotics
 Estrogen receptor beta § Agonists

References

External links
 Erteberel - AdisInsight

Antipsychotics
Benzopyrans
Cyclopentanes
Diols
Selective ERβ agonists
Synthetic estrogens